Erwin Verstegen (31 July 1970 – 5 March 1995) was a Dutch archer. He competed in the men's individual and team events at the 1992 Summer Olympics.

References

1970 births
1995 deaths
Dutch male archers
Olympic archers of the Netherlands
Archers at the 1992 Summer Olympics
People from Veghel
Sportspeople from North Brabant